Al-Ruways, was a Palestinian Arab village on a rocky hill located  southeast of Acre and south of the village of al-Damun. Its population in 1945 was 330. Al-Ruways was depopulated following its capture by Israeli forces during the 1948 Arab-Israeli War.

History

Middle Ages
Al-Ruways stood on the site of the Crusader town of Careblier, which was also referred to by the Crusaders as "Roeis". In 1220, Beatrix de Courtenay and her husband Count Otto von Botenlauben, Henneberg, sold their land, including Roeis’, to the Teutonic Knights. However, they appeared not to have sole ownership, as in 1253 John Aleman, Lord of Caesarea, sold several villages, including Roeis, to the Knights Hospitaller. In 1266, a Crusader vanguard returning from a raid in Tiberias to Acre was ambushed at Roeis by Mamluk forces based in Safad. In 1283 it was mentioned as part of the domain of the Crusaders in the hudna (truce) between the Acre-based Crusaders and the Mamluk sultan al-Mansur Qalawun.

Based on tradition, the people of the village professed to have blood relations with Husam ad-Din Abu al-Hija. Hussam ad-Din was a high-ranking officer in the Ayyubid army of Sultan Saladin.

Ottoman era
French explorer Victor Guérin visited al-Ruways in 1875, and noted that the village contained "150 people at most, whose homes are located on a hill, amid gardens filled with fig, pomegranate and olive trees, and here and there are palm trees".

In 1881, the PEF's Survey of Western Palestine described al-Ruways as being situated on open ground with olive groves to the north of the village. Its population of 400 was entirely Muslim.

A population list from about 1887 showed that Ruweis had about 190  inhabitants; all Muslims.

British Mandate era
Under the British Mandate of Palestine in the early twentieth century, al-Ruways was one of the smallest villages in the District of Acre. In the 1922 census  Al-Ruways had a population of 154; all Muslims,  increasing in the 1931 census to 217, still all Muslim, in a total of 44 houses. and consisting of two quarters.

The village had a mosque. Its children attended school in nearby al-Damun. The inhabitants' drinking water came from domestic wells, and they primarily grew wheat, corn, sesame, watermelons, and olives.

In  the 1945 statistics  the population of al-Ruways was 330  Muslims, who owned 1,163 dunams of land according to an official land and population survey. 222 dunams were plantations and irrigable land, 844 used for cereals, while built-up areas consisted of 15 dunams.

Israeli rule
On 18 July 1948, two days after Nazareth was occupied by Israel's Seventh Armored Brigade in Operation Dekel, some units advanced into the Western Galilee and captured a number of Arab villages, one of which was al-Ruways. The inhabitants fled after bombardment and the fall of major towns in the vicinity, namely Shefa-'Amr and Nazareth. Following the war the area was incorporated into the State of Israel. According to Palestinian historian Walid Khalidi, "the site is deserted. The debris of old wells and cement roofs is strewn of over the site, which is otherwise covered by a forest of eucalyptus trees and cactus." By 1992 there were no villages on al-Ruways land, but the surrounding area was cultivated by residents of kibbutz Yas'ur.

See also
Depopulated Palestinian locations in Israel
Ein Hod

Notes

Bibliography

  (pp. 179-185, 224-235.)
  

  
  
 (p.  35)
  (p. 663)

External links
 al-Ruways Palestine Remembered
al-Ruways,  Zochrot
Survey of Western Palestine, Map 5:  IAA, Wikimedia commons 
al-Ruways from the Khalil Sakakini Cultural Centre
Al-Rweis photos from Dr. Moslih Kanaaneh   

Arab villages depopulated during the 1948 Arab–Israeli War
District of Acre
1948 disestablishments in Israel